The Politics of Poitou-Charentes, France takes place in a framework of a presidential representative democracy, whereby the President of Regional Council is the head of government, and of a pluriform multi-party system. Legislative power is vested in the regional council.

Executive 

The executive of the region is led by the President of the regional council.

Current composition

List of presidents

Legislative branch 

The Regional Council of Poitou-Charentes (Conseil régional de Poitou-Charentes) is composed of 56 councillors, elected by proportional representation in a two-round system. The winning list in the second round is automatically entitled to a quarter of the seats. The remainder of the seats are allocated through proportional representation with a 5% threshold.

The Council is elected for a six-year term.

Current composition

Elections

Other elections 

In the 2007 legislative election, the PS won 11 seats, the UMP won 4, and the New Centre won one. In addition, one Socialist dissident (Miscellaneous Left won one seat in Charente.

References

External links 
Poitou-Charentes Region